Aterpini is weevil tribe in the subfamily Cyclominae.

Genera 
 Aades
 Acalonoma
 Aesiotes
 Alastoropolus
 Alphitopis
 Anagotus
 Anomocis
 Aoplocnemis
 Aterpodes
 Cechides
 Chrysolopus
 Chrysophoracis
 Dexagia
 Dixoncis
 Euthyphasis
 Heterotyles
 Iphisaxus
 Julietiella
 Lyperopais
 Micropolus
 Nemestra
 Oenopus
 Ophthalmorychus
 Pelororhinus
 Psuchocephalus
 Rhadinosomus
 Rhinaria
 Rhinoplethes
 Stenotherium
 ?Aromagis
 ?Atelicus
 ?Kershawcis
 ?Strongylorhinus

References 

Cyclominae